The 1991 Estoril Open was a tennis tournament played on outdoor clay courts. This event was the 2nd edition of the Estoril Open, included in the 1991 ATP Tour World Series. The event took place at the Estoril Court Central, in Oeiras, Portugal, from April 1 through April 8, 1991.

Finals

Singles

 Sergi Bruguera defeated  Karel Nováček, 7–6(9–7), 6–1
It was Bruguera's 1st title of his career.

Doubles

 Paul Haarhuis /  Mark Koevermans defeated  Tom Nijssen /  Cyril Suk, 6–3, 6–3
It was Haarhuis' 1st title of the year and 2nd of his career. It was Koevermans' 1st title of his career.

References